Ahran (also Romanized as Ahrān) is a village in Jamabrud Rural District, in the Central District of Damavand County, Tehran Province, Iran. At the 2006 census, its population was 467, in 113 families.

References 

Populated places in Damavand County